Iskandar Widjaja (born 6 June 1986) is a German violinist and winner of numerous international competitions.

Life 
Widjaja was born in Berlin. His grandfather is the Indonesian composer Udin Widjaja, his parents are Indonesian Widjaja began playing the violin at the age of four. In 2003, he moved to the Stern Conservatory of the Berlin University of the Arts to study with Uwe-Martin Haiberg and Ilan Gronich.

Concert tours have taken him to all five continents with the Berlin Philharmonie, the Aula Simfonia Jakarta, the Tel Aviv Opera House, the Hong Kong City Hall. He regularly appears as a soloist with orchestras such as the Sydney Symphony Orchestra, the German Symphony Orchestra and the Konzerthausorchester Berlin, L'Orchestre de la Suisse Romande, the Warsaw, Munich and Shanghai Philharmonic Orchestras and others.

In 2013, he performed for the first time in Hong Kong and played at the opening event of the APEC Summit in Bali.

In 2014, he made his debut at the Münchner Philharmoniker conducted by Christoph Eschenbach.

In 2007–2009, Widjaja played on a more than 150 year old violin by Nicolas Darche, which was given to him on loan as a multiple prize winner of the Competition of the German Musical Instrument Fund.

He currently plays a violin by JB Vuillaume, 1875, as well as the Stradivarius "Stephens" 1690, on loan from Florian Leonhardt

On 29 May 2016, he made his debut at the Berlin Philharmoniker with the Deutsches Symphonie-Orchester Berlin conducted by Christoph Eschenbach.

At the same time, he frequently performs at mass media events such as Miss World or Miss Earth, the Davis Cup, the EXPO in Milan, Fashion Week in Paris or for the world premiere of the Suite for Violin and Orchestra "Across the Stars" from Star Wars by John Williams at the Wiener Konzerthaus.

Iskandar is heavily involved in educational projects for children in the Asia-Pacific region, in collaboration with UNICEF and the WWF (World Wrestling Federation). With KOMPAS Gramedia, Indonesia's largest media group, he organised charities to fund musical instruments and lessons for street children.

In 2018, the  hosted his first own tour of Germany among others at the Elbphilharmonie Hamburg.

Honours and awards 
 2003: Four-year scholarship to Indiana University Bloomington.
 2004: First prize at the national Jugend musiziert competition in the violin solo category and 2nd prize at the Queen Sophie Charlotte international competition.
 2006: Third Prize at the Violin Competition of the Ibolyka Gyarfas Foundation.
 2008: First prize at the International Hindemith Competition and award of the Paul Hindemith Gold Medal and the Maggini Foundation Prize
 2008: Gerd Bucerius-Scholarship from the Deutsche Stiftung Musikleben, which enabled him to take part in the International Violin Master Class. "Keshet Eilon" in Tel Aviv with Ida Haendel, Shlomo Mintz and Eduard Dawidowitsch Gratsch.
 2009: Special prize "Bester Bach" and "Beste Beethoven Sonate" at "Concorso Internazionale Violinistico Andrea Postacchini"
 2009: First "Goldener Julius" in the "Junior Julius" category for extraordinary talent in violin playing.
 2013: LOTTO-Förderpreis des Rheingau Musik Festival

Publications 
 2011: Bach 'N' Blues (OehmsClassics Musikproduktion GmbH)
 2014: Precious Refuge (OehmsClassics Musikproduktion GmbH)
 2015: Tango Fuego/Trio Cayao (OehmsClassics Musikproduktion GmbH)
 2018: Schumann Violin Sonate Nr. 2, Fantasie für Violine und Orchester op. 121, Christoph Eschenbach, Deutsches-Symphonieorchester Berlin  (OehmsClassics Musikproduktion GmbH)
 2018: Mercy (Edel/Neue Meister)
 2019: Fazıl Say, 1001 Nights in the Harem (Sony Classical), Iraz Yildiz, Vienna Radio Symphony Orchestra, Howard Griffiths
 2020: Iskandar Widjaja - Hip Hop Symphony

Quote 
"When violinist Iskandar Widjaja first played in Indonesia five years ago, the audience disregarded classical music etiquette, clapping after each piece.... They just couldn't get enough".

"the young violinist captivates with his sensitive attention to detail - and a charmingly youthful sense of kitsch-free, authentic romance."

"Isaac Stern couldn’t have wished for a brighter spotlight.  If Widjaja has been received  as a sort of pop star, then he’s succeeded on a even higher level in bringing rich musical values to the marketplace than have, say, Nigel Kennedy and David Garrett. His versions of Bach sound like no others. He weds strong timbral individuality to comprehensive technical command and deep musical insight. Urgently recommended! A young violinist, synthesizing much of value from the past with much of value from the present. Intensely interesting—and riveting".

References

External links 

 
 
 
 Filmporträt von brainworkers & more
 Iskandar Widjaja bei YOUTUBE
 Iskandar Widjaja: Pulling all the Right Strings, Article in the Jakarta Post dated 9 June 2013
 Iskandar Widjaja: Künstler nicht in Schubladen stecken

German classical violinists
Male classical violinists
1986 births
Living people
Musicians from Berlin